Best Evidence is a 2007-present documentary television series on the Discovery Channel and Discovery Times channel.

Episodes
 "TWA Flight 800"
 "Bigfoot"
 "Chemical Contrails": Jet-aircraft vapor trails may be toxic.
 "The Roswell Incident"
 "John Wayne's Death"
 "Cattle Mutilations"
 "Near-Death Experiences"
 "Alien Abductions"
 "Crop Circles"
 "The Visitors"
 "Strange Encounters"
 "The Government Cover Up"
 "UFO Phenomenon"
 "Government Cover-up"

External links
 Best Evidence schedule on Discovery Channel
 Best Evidence schedule on Discovery Times

2007 American television series debuts
2000s American documentary television series
2010s American documentary television series
2020s American documentary television series
Discovery Channel original programming